The Castle of Vêves occupies a rocky platform in Wallonia just outside the village of Celles, in the province of Namur, Belgium. It is classified as Major Heritage of Wallonia.

History 
According to tradition, the site has been occupied by castles since the time of Pippin of Herstal (7th century). In the later Middle Ages, the area fell under control of the Beaufort family, which oversaw the construction of a stronghold here in about 1230. 

The present castle, in the form of an irregular pentagon and flanked by six round towers of varying size, dates largely from around 1410. Successive restorations modified especially the walls of the inner courtyard, one of which is lined with a distinctive half-timbered gallery of two levels, and another of which was given a red brick facade in the Louis XV style. The northern frontage is crowned with a small cupola containing a clock.

See also
List of castles in Belgium

References
Countess Marie-Caroline d'Ursel, Cinquante châteaux evoquent l'histoire de Belgique (Brussels, 1972)

External links
Chateau de Veves website
Picture of the Chateau
Interview with Count Hadelin de Liedekerke Beaufort, the owner of Chateau de Veves

Wallonia's Major Heritage
7th-century establishments in Francia
Buildings and structures completed in 1410
Historic house museums in Belgium
Veves
Veves
Museums in Namur (province)